Christian Syse (born 30 September 1962) is a Norwegian civil servant and diplomat.

Syse is a son of Else and Jan P. Syse, and a brother of Henrik Syse. He was educated at the Norwegian School of Economics and at Yale University.

He was hired at the Office of the Prime Minister from 1998 to 2003, and then served as secretary for the Standing Committee on Foreign Affairs. From 2008 to 2011 he was appointed deputy under-secretary of state (ekspedisjonssjef) in the Ministry of Foreign affairs, and from 2011 he assumed the position of Assistant Secretary General.

In December 2016 he was appointed ambassador to the Norwegian embassy in Stockholm, effective from 2017.

Syse is married to Siv Nordrum, a journalist, communication director and politician. Siv died on 24 April 2021 after a short illness.

References

1962 births
Living people
Norwegian civil servants
Ambassadors of Norway to Sweden
Norwegian School of Economics alumni
Yale University alumni